The 1991 Castle Point Borough Council election took place on 2 May 1991 to elect members of Castle Point Borough Council in Essex, England.

Results summary

References

Castle Point Borough Council elections
1991 English local elections
1990s in Essex